Yoell's Copse is a   Local Nature Reserve in Horndean in Hampshire. It is owned and managed by Horndean Parish Council.

This ancient wood has coppiced mature oak trees and wild service trees. There are uncommon plants such as butcher's-broom and common cow-wheat.

References

Local Nature Reserves in Hampshire